The fifth-generation Ford Mondeo is a mid-size sedan manufactured by Ford through its joint venture Changan Ford in China since 2022. It is the replacement for the outgoing fourth-generation Mondeo and the Chinese market Taurus. The car is the sedan counterpart of the Evos crossover, and shares the same platform as the mid-size luxury Lincoln Z. It is also marketed in the Middle East as the Ford Taurus. 

Reports have indicated that the car will not be available in Europe, the United States and Canada due to a shrinking traditional sedan market.

Overview
The new Ford Mondeo was first spied testing in Belgium in June 2021, then again in Michigan, United States later in October 2021. Its is exclusively produced and sold in China, as Ford now focuses on pickup trucks, SUVs, and the Mustang in North America.

The Mondeo uses an eight-speed automatic transmission and is front-wheel drive. 

Trim levels in China are Fashion, Sport and ST-Line.

Export markets 

The fifth-generation Mondeo is marketed in GCC countries as the Ford Taurus, replacing the Chinese-sourced Taurus which itself replaced the Fusion and the sixth-generation Taurus models. Three trim levels are available, the Ambiente, Trend, and Titanium. 

All models include six airbags, a 13.2-inch touch screen with an eight-inch digital gauge cluster, and a rear-view camera as standard.

References

External links

 

Mondeo (fifth generation)
Cars introduced in 2022
Cars of China
Sedans
Front-wheel-drive vehicles